Bologne is an alternate spelling for Bologna, a city in Italy.

Bologne may also refer to:
 
Bologne, Haute-Marne, commune
Joseph Bologne (disambiguation)
Jean Bologne (1529-1608), Flemish sculptor based in Italy
Vieux Bologne

See also
Baloney (disambiguation)
Bologna (disambiguation)